Big City Rhythms is a 1999 album by American vocalist Michael Feinstein accompanied by the Maynard Ferguson big band. It was Feinstein's second album for the Concord label, and his first with Maynard Ferguson.

Reception

The Allmusic review by Jonathan Widran awarded the album 4 stars and said the pairing of Feinstein and Ferguson "such a rousing success that it's surprising the two didn't think of it before".

Track listing
 "Close Your Eyes" (Bernice Petkere) - 2:57
 "The Very Thought of You" (Ray Noble) - 5:29
 "Let Me Off Uptown" (Earl Bostic, Redd Evans) - 3:34
 "Girl Talk" (Neal Hefti, Bobby Troup) - 5:07
 "You Can't Lose 'Em All" (Marshall Barer, David Ross) - 4:33
 "One Day at a Time" (Charles DeForest) - 3:54
 "The Rhythm of the Blues" (Michael Feinstein, Lindy Robbins) - 5:52
 "The One I Love (Belongs to Somebody Else)" (Isham Jones, Gus Kahn) - 5:25
 "Ev'rything You Want Is Here" (Murray Grand) - 4:29
 "Johnny One Note" (Lorenz Hart, Richard Rodgers) - 2:27
 "Swing Is Back in Style" (Feinstein, Ray Jessel, Cynthia Thompson) - 2:38
 "Love Is Nothin' But a Racket" (Betty Comden, Adolph Green, André Previn) - 3:27
 "Lullaby in Rhythm" (Benny Goodman, Walter Hirsch, Clarence Profit, Edgar Sampson) - 3:25
 Medley: "When Your Lover Has Gone"/"The Gal That Got Away" (Einar Aaron Swan)/(Harold Arlen, Ira Gershwin) - 4:59
 "New York, New York" (Leonard Bernstein, Comden, Green, John Kander) - 3:38
 "How Little We Know" (Hoagy Carmichael, Johnny Mercer) - 2:43

Personnel
Michael Feinstein - vocals, piano
The Maynard Ferguson big band:
Maynard Ferguson - bandleader, flugelhorn, producer, trumpet
Tom Garling - arranger, trombone
Brian Stahurski - double bass
Albie Berk - drums
Dave Throckmorton - drum set
Bobby Shew - flugelhorn, trumpet
Dennis Budimir - guitar
Larry Bunker - percussion
Earl MacDonald - piano
Matt Catingub - alto saxophone
Mike Dubaniewicz - alto saxophone
Gary Foster
Sal Lozano - baritone saxophone
Jim Brenan - tenor saxophone
Dan Higgins
Alexander Iles - trombone
Reggie Watkins - trombone
Bryant Byers - bass trombone
Adolfo Acosta - trumpet
Wayne Bergeron
Brian Ploeger - trumpet
Jim Self - tuba
Alan Broadbent - arranger, conductor
Eddie Karam
Mort Lindsey
Patrick Williams
Production
Charles Paakkari - assistant engineer
Dann Thompson
Albert Treskin - design
Alexis Davis - director, production coordination
Leslie Ann Jones - engineer, mixing
Ken DiMaio - Live Sound Engineer
Glen Barros - executive producer
Antonio Branco - stylist
Roger Dong - portrait photography
Shay Ashula - hair stylist, make-up
Paul Stubblebine - mastering
Bill Hughes - music contractor, music preparation
Bruce Burr - photography
John Burk - producer
Allen Sviridoff

References

Concord Records albums
Maynard Ferguson albums
Michael Feinstein albums
1999 albums